Highway 103 is an east-west highway in Nova Scotia that runs from Halifax to Yarmouth.

The highway follows a route of  along the province's South Shore region fronting the Atlantic coast. The route parallels its predecessor, local Trunk 3. The highway varies from 2-lane controlled access to 2-lane local secondary roads on the section between Yarmouth and Hebbville. East of Hebbville to Ingramport, the highway is 2-lane controlled access, with the exception of a  4-lane divided freeway near Chester. From just west of Ingramport (exit 5A), to the interchange with Highway 102 (near Bayers Lake) in Halifax, the highway is 4-lane divided freeway. Same as Highway 101, kilometre markers increase running west-to-east, increasing from Yarmouth to Halifax; with exit numbers running east-to-west, increasing from Halifax to Yarmouth.

In 2013, Highway 103 was redesignated as the Fishermen's Memorial Highway.

History
The highway has developed sporadically since the 1970s, with the 2-lane controlled access portion to Bridgewater being largely responsible for the abandonment of CN Rail's South Shore line, the former Halifax and Southwestern Railway. 

In November 1998, construction was completed that twinned a five kilometer section of highway between exit 2 and exit 3. In November 2006, construction was completed that twinned 15 kilometres of highway between exit 3 and exit 5. In December 2006, an 8.3 kilometre bypass around Barrington was completed.

In late September 2015 a new section of highway was opened to bypass the Port Joli area. In November 2016, a new section was completed which bypassed Port Mouton. Residents complained that the single exit east of the community had lengthened the trip for people heading west from Port Mouton.

The new interchange in Ingramport (exit 5A) opened in January 2017.

Work on twinning Highway 103 from exit 5 (Tantallon) to exit 5A (Ingramport) began in February, 2018 and was completed in December, 2020. Twinning from exit 5A (Ingramport) to exit 6 (Hubbards) started in 2020 with an expected completion date of late 2022-early 2023.

Names of Highway 103

 Fishermen's Memorial Highway - June 2013
 Barrington Bypass - Barrington to Oak Park, Shelburne County 
 Nine Mile Road - Sable River to Jordan Falls, Shelburne County

Safety concerns
Between 2006 and 2009, there were 29 deaths on the highway. In 2009, it was considered Nova Scotia's deadliest highway and was ranked the second most dangerous highway in Canada by the Canadian Automobile Association. In 2009 alone, ten people died in automobile accidents on the highway, according to the Nova Scotia Department of Transportation and Infrastructure Renewal. Between 2008 and 2012, there were 22 fatalities on the highway.

In September 2018, local residents raised concern over the presence of a road sign on the highway, near the turnoff to Port Mouton, that had a very confusing appearance, looking like a patchwork of several other road signs. It was supposedly revealed when a hotel removed its billboard advertisement, revealing the sign below.

Exit list

Communities
Halifax
Beechville
Lakeside
Timberlea
Hubley
Lewis Lake
Upper Tantallon
Head of St. Margarets Bay
Ingramport
Black Point
Queensland
Hubbards
Simms Settlement
East River
East Chester
Windsor Road
Chester Basin
Beech Hill
Gold River
Western Shore
Martins Point
Martins River
Oakland
Clearland
Blockhouse
Maitland
Pine Grove
Oakhill
Bridgewater
Cookville
Bridgewater
Wileville
Hebbville
Hebbs Cross
Italy Cross
Middlewood
Danesville
Mill Village
Brooklyn
Milton

References

External links

Highway 103 Improvement Projects

103
103
103
103
103
103
103
Bridgewater, Nova Scotia
Yarmouth, Nova Scotia